Aydoğdu is a village in the Tavas district of Denizli Province, Turkey. Aydoğdu is located about 62 km south of the provincial capital, Denizli and 18 km southeast of Tavas. Legend has it that the name of the village was originally Abaz, named after its founder, Abass, whose tomb was demolished but later rebuilt. Abass and other ghazi fighters were active during the Seljuk Sultanate of Rum era. 640 people inhabit Aydoğdu as of the last census in 2012., and the village generally experiences dry summers and cold, snowy winters.

References

Villages in Tavas District